The Amilcar M is a mid-sized car, initially in the 7CV car tax band, made between 1928 and 1935 by the French Amilcar company.    Most of the cars were delivered with a boxy four door “berline” body characteristic of the late 1920s.

Initially the car was simply known as the “Amilcar Type M”, launched in an attempt by the manufacturer to recover from the fiasco of the predecessor models, the Types "G” and “L”. Amilcar had earlier gained reputation and market share as producers of cyclecars in the lean years that followed the First World War, but as consumer spending power grew in the later 1920s, the company’s attempts to expand upmarket, had met with only limited success. Top speed would have varied according to the weight and style of the body specified, but a maximum of approximately 110 km/h (68 mph) was quoted.

Power was transferred from the front-mounted engine to the rear wheels via a four speed manual gear-box.   The suspension combined leaf springs with Hartford dampers, front and back.

For 1929 the “Type M” was replaced with the “Type M2”, incorporating minor improvements.   The process was repeated for 1931 when the “Type M3”, incorporating further modest upgrades, took over from the “Type M2”.   The “Type M3” continued to be offered until 1935.   Towards the end of 1934 the manufacturer also announced the “Type M4” which combined the chassis of the existing car with a larger 1,628 cc engine and which was intended to compete higher up in the market hierarchy.     These were nevertheless difficult times for Amilcar.    In August 1934 the manufacturer closed the doors of their factory at Saint-Denis  for the last time, and although for the time being production continued in a smaller factory in the Paris region, the scale of operations was necessarily reduced, and by the end of 1935 the “Type M3” and “Type M4” had been withdrawn, leaving Amilcar down to a single model.

In volume terms, despite outselling similarly sized predecessor models, the Type M never sold in huge numbers, with approximately 2,650 “Type M2”s emerging from the plant between 1928 and 1931 and a further 2,700 “Type M3”s between 1931 and 1935.   These numbers fell well short of those being achieved by volume automakers such as Peugeot and Citroën during the 1930s, and with the French auto-market appearing to divide rather starkly between high volume producers of small to medium sized cars and low volume producers of larger more luxurious cars, the underwhelming volumes achieved by Amilcar’s middle market cars left the company’s finances, already burdened by debts built up at least in part to finance an extensive race programme in the 1920s, looking unsustainable.

In the event, the “Type M” did in fact have an Amilcar successor in the form of the innovative Amilcar Compound, exhibited at the Paris Motor Show in October 1937.   By that time, however, Amilcar had lost its independence, and become little more than a badge for a model financed and produced by the Hotchkiss company which had rescued Amilcar at the time of its most recent financial collapse.

References

Amilcar vehicles
Cars introduced in 1928